Diego López Noguerol (born 13 May 2002) is a Spanish professional footballer who plays as a forward for Valencia Mestalla.

Club career
López began playing football at the youth academy of FC Figueiredo where he scored more than 150 goals, and then Xeitosa where he scored 54 goals in his single season with them. His goalscoring earned him a move to the youth academy of Sporting Gijón, followed by a short stint with Real Madrid, and finally moving to Barcelona in 2018. He moved to Valencia Mestalla on 7 July 2021.

López made his professional – and La Liga – debut with Valencia on 29 August 2022, coming on as a late substitute in a 1–0 loss to Atlético Madrid.

References

External links
 
 
 
 Real Madrid profile

2002 births
Living people
Footballers from Mieres, Asturias
Spanish footballers
Association football wingers
Valencia CF Mestalla footballers
Valencia CF players
La Liga players
Tercera Federación players